Acetone azine is the simplest ketazine. It is an intermediate in some hydrazine manufacturing processes.

Synthesis 

Acetone azine can be prepared from acetone and hydrazine:
2 (CH3)2CO + N2H4 → 2 H2O + [(CH3)2C=N]2

It can also be produced from acetone (2 eq.), ammonia (2 eq.) and hydrogen peroxide (1 eq.). The first step is the formation of acetone imine, Me2C=NH; this is then oxidized by hydrogen peroxide through a complex mechanism to give 3,3-dimethyloxaziridine, which reacts with a further molecule of ammonia to produce acetone hydrazone. The hydrazone then condenses with a further molecule of acetone to produce the azine. The acetone azine product is distilled out of the reaction mixture as its azeotrope with water (n(H2O)/n(azine) ≈ 6).

Reactions 
Acetone azine can be used to prepare acetone hydrazone and 2-diazopropane.

Hydrazine can be produced through acid-catalysed hydrolysis of acetone azine:
 2 H2O + [(CH3)2C=N]2 → 2 (CH3)2CO + N2H4

References 

Azines (hydrazine derivatives)